Voetbalvereniging Waardenburg Neerijnen Combinatie (VV WNC) is an association football club from Waardenburg, Netherlands, playing in the Vierde Divisie since 2022. Its home ground is Sportpark De Korte Woerden, located near and visible from the A2 motorway.

History 
WNC was founded on 1 September 1950. 

In 2014, through playoffs, the club promoted for the first time to the Eerste Klasse. In the celebrations, 20 members of the club were injured, when a moving trailer rolled over. In 2022, WNC promoted to the Vierde Divisie, also through playoffs.

References

Football clubs in the Netherlands
Football clubs in Gelderland
Association football clubs established in 1950
1950 establishments in the Netherlands
West Betuwe